Abdopus undulatus is a species of octopus within the family Octopodidae. The species is found near the coasts of Tongatapu, Tonga, in benthic environments at depths of 8 to 20 meters. Individuals to grow up to 3.3 centimeters in length.

References 

Molluscs described in 2007
Octopodidae
Molluscs of the Pacific Ocean
Fauna of Tonga